The Shilovo constituency (No.150) was a Russian legislative constituency in Ryazan Oblast in 1993–2007. The constituency covered rural Ryazan Oblast to the south of Ryazan. Currently territory of the former Shilovo constituency is split between Ryazan and Skopin constituencies.

Members elected

Election results

1993

|-
! colspan=2 style="background-color:#E9E9E9;text-align:left;vertical-align:top;" |Candidate
! style="background-color:#E9E9E9;text-align:left;vertical-align:top;" |Party
! style="background-color:#E9E9E9;text-align:right;" |Votes
! style="background-color:#E9E9E9;text-align:right;" |%
|-
|style="background-color:"|
|align=left|Sergey Yenkov
|align=left|Independent
|
|21.02%
|-
|style="background-color:"|
|align=left|Mikhail Kosikov
|align=left|Independent
| -
|19.20%
|-
| colspan="5" style="background-color:#E9E9E9;"|
|- style="font-weight:bold"
| colspan="3" style="text-align:left;" | Total
| 
| 100%
|-
| colspan="5" style="background-color:#E9E9E9;"|
|- style="font-weight:bold"
| colspan="4" |Source:
|
|}

1995

|-
! colspan=2 style="background-color:#E9E9E9;text-align:left;vertical-align:top;" |Candidate
! style="background-color:#E9E9E9;text-align:left;vertical-align:top;" |Party
! style="background-color:#E9E9E9;text-align:right;" |Votes
! style="background-color:#E9E9E9;text-align:right;" |%
|-
|style="background-color:"|
|align=left|Sergey Yenkov (incumbent)
|align=left|Agrarian Party
|
|28.65%
|-
|style="background-color:"|
|align=left|Grigory Ivliyev
|align=left|Independent
|
|25.36%
|-
|style="background-color:"|
|align=left|Vladimir Groshev
|align=left|Independent
|
|18.95%
|-
 |style="background-color:"|
|align=left|Viktor Rakov
|align=left|Liberal Democratic Party
|
|6.38%
|-
|style="background-color:"|
|align=left|Vasily Grigoryev
|align=left|Independent
|
|6.32%
|-
|style="background-color:#2C299A"|
|align=left|Yury Savchuk
|align=left|Congress of Russian Communities
|
|3.80%
|-
|style="background-color:#295EC4"|
|align=left|Sergey Dergachev
|align=left|Party of Economic Freedom
|
|1.88%
|-
|style="background-color:#000000"|
|colspan=2 |against all
|
|7.29%
|-
| colspan="5" style="background-color:#E9E9E9;"|
|- style="font-weight:bold"
| colspan="3" style="text-align:left;" | Total
| 
| 100%
|-
| colspan="5" style="background-color:#E9E9E9;"|
|- style="font-weight:bold"
| colspan="4" |Source:
|
|}

1999

|-
! colspan=2 style="background-color:#E9E9E9;text-align:left;vertical-align:top;" |Candidate
! style="background-color:#E9E9E9;text-align:left;vertical-align:top;" |Party
! style="background-color:#E9E9E9;text-align:right;" |Votes
! style="background-color:#E9E9E9;text-align:right;" |%
|-
|style="background-color:"|
|align=left|Vyacheslav Olenyev
|align=left|Independent
|
|32.60%
|-
|style="background-color:#3B9EDF"|
|align=left|Valery Kalashnikov
|align=left|Fatherland – All Russia
|
|18.42%
|-
|style="background-color:"|
|align=left|Nikolay Barsuk
|align=left|Our Home – Russia
|
|7.25%
|-
|style="background-color:#020266"|
|align=left|Dmitry Voronkov
|align=left|Russian Socialist Party
|
|6.25%
|-
|style="background-color:#E2CA66"|
|align=left|Vladimir Rasskazov
|align=left|For Civil Dignity
|
|4.09%
|-
|style="background:#1042A5"| 
|align=left|Aleksey Sukhov
|align=left|Union of Right Forces
|
|4.07%
|-
|style="background:#084284"| 
|align=left|Igor Yanin
|align=left|Spiritual Heritage
|
|3.95%
|-
|style="background-color:"|
|align=left|Viktor Rakov
|align=left|Liberal Democratic Party
|
|3.68%
|-
|style="background-color:"|
|align=left|Oksana Pavlyuchenko
|align=left|Independent
|
|3.60%
|-
|style="background-color:"|
|align=left|Vasily Martynov
|align=left|Independent
|
|1.57%
|-
|style="background-color:#C62B55"|
|align=left|Andrey Bychkaylo
|align=left|Peace, Labour, May
|
|1.02%
|-
|style="background-color:#000000"|
|colspan=2 |against all
|
|11.68%
|-
| colspan="5" style="background-color:#E9E9E9;"|
|- style="font-weight:bold"
| colspan="3" style="text-align:left;" | Total
| 
| 100%
|-
| colspan="5" style="background-color:#E9E9E9;"|
|- style="font-weight:bold"
| colspan="4" |Source:
|
|}

2003

|-
! colspan=2 style="background-color:#E9E9E9;text-align:left;vertical-align:top;" |Candidate
! style="background-color:#E9E9E9;text-align:left;vertical-align:top;" |Party
! style="background-color:#E9E9E9;text-align:right;" |Votes
! style="background-color:#E9E9E9;text-align:right;" |%
|-
|style="background-color:"|
|align=left|Igor Morozov
|align=left|United Russia
|
|34.76%
|-
|style="background-color:"|
|align=left|Vyacheslav Olenyev (incumbent)
|align=left|Agrarian Party
|
|26.66%
|-
|style="background-color:#C21022"|
|align=left|Nikolay Komkov
|align=left|Russian Pensioners' Party-Party of Social Justice
|
|7.37%
|-
|style="background-color:"|
|align=left|Svetlana Kprf
|align=left|Independent
|
|5.18%
|-
|style="background-color:"|
|align=left|Sergey Akimov
|align=left|Liberal Democratic Party
|
|3.61%
|-
|style="background-color:"|
|align=left|Vasily Kirin
|align=left|Independent
|
|3.61%
|-
|style="background-color:"|
|align=left|Nikolay Bocharov
|align=left|Rodina
|
|2.39%
|-
|style="background:#1042A5"| 
|align=left|Vladimir Gridasov
|align=left|Union of Right Forces
|
|1.82%
|-
|style="background:#00A1FF"| 
|align=left|Yevgeny Vologzhanin
|align=left|Party of Russia's Rebirth-Russian Party of Life
|
|1.45%
|-
|style="background:#11007D"| 
|align=left|Leonid Kanayev
|align=left|Unity
|
|0.77%
|-
|style="background-color:#164C8C"|
|align=left|Aleksey Zakharov
|align=left|United Russian Party Rus'
|
|0.56%
|-
|style="background-color:#7C73CC"|
|align=left|Anatoly Karpus
|align=left|Great Russia – Eurasian Union
|
|0.52%
|-
|style="background-color:#000000"|
|colspan=2 |against all
|
|9.38%
|-
| colspan="5" style="background-color:#E9E9E9;"|
|- style="font-weight:bold"
| colspan="3" style="text-align:left;" | Total
| 
| 100%
|-
| colspan="5" style="background-color:#E9E9E9;"|
|- style="font-weight:bold"
| colspan="4" |Source:
|
|}

Notes

References

Obsolete Russian legislative constituencies
Politics of Ryazan Oblast